is a junction passenger railway station located in the town of  Tadotsu, Nakatado District, Kagawa Prefecture, Japan. It is operated by JR Shikoku. The station is also a freight depot for the Japan Freight Railway Company (JR Freight)

Lines
Yosan line local, Rapid Sunport, and Nanpū Relay services stop at the station.It is also station "D12" for the Dosan Line of which it is also the terminal station and is 126.6 kilometers from the opposing terminal at Kōchi Station.

Layout
The station consists of two island platforms connected by an underground passage, serving four tracks. The station building has a Midori no Madoguchi staffed ticket office. Despite a relatively large number of passengers each day, the station hanse barrier-free facilities, and wheelchair users must access the platforms by a staff-only passage on the premises with a station attendant..A JGR Class 8620 steam locomotive is on display outside the station.

History
Tadotsu Station was opened on May 23, 1889 as a station on the Sanuki Railway Line between Marugame and Kotohira. Sanyo Railway joined to this stationing 1903 and Sanuki Railway was acquired by Sanyo Railway on December 1, 1904, and was subsequently nationalized on December 1, 1906. The station was relocated to its current site on December 20, 1913 to eliminate a switchback, and the old location became a freight depot. With the privatization of JNR on April 1,1987, control of the station passed to JR Shikoku.

Surrounding area
Tadotsu Town Office
Shorinji Kempo Sohonzan
Tadotsu Port
Shikoku Railway Tadotsu Factory

See also
 List of railway stations in Japan

References

External links
Official home page

Railway stations in Kagawa Prefecture
Railway stations in Japan opened in 1889
Stations of Japan Freight Railway Company
Tadotsu, Kagawa